Dolarna Vasana is a village in Gandhinagar district in the Indian state of Gujarat.

Villages in Gandhinagar district